The Swan Princess is an animated film series that began with the 1994 film The Swan Princess.

Films

The Swan Princess (1994)

The Swan Princess is a 1994 American animated musical fantasy film based on the ballet Swan Lake. Starring the voices of Jack Palance, John Cleese, Steven Wright, and Sandy Duncan, the film was directed by a former Disney animation director, Richard Rich, and produced by Nest Family Entertainment / Rich Animation Studios and with a music score by Lex de Azevedo. The story follows the relationship between Princess Odette and Prince Derek, who, pushed together by their respective parents, dislike each other as children and teenagers, but develop romantic feelings for each other as adults, get married, and are established as the future rulers of the kingdom. It was released theatrically on November 18, 1994, where it received mixed reviews from critics.

The Swan Princess: Escape from Castle Mountain (1997)

The Swan Princess: Escape from Castle Mountain / The Swan Princess: The Secret of the Castle is a 1997 American animated musical-fantasy film and the direct-to-video sequel to the animated film The Swan Princess. Directed by Richard Rich (who also directed the original), the film follows Derek and Odette one year after their wedding. Their anniversary celebrations are suddenly disrupted by the actions of the wizard Clavius, who wants to regain the Forbidden Arts and destroy their happiness.

The Swan Princess III: The Mystery of the Enchanted Treasure (1998)

The Swan Princess: The Mystery of the Enchanted Kingdom / The Swan Princess III: The Mystery of the Enchanted Treasure is a direct-to-video film and the third installment in The Swan Princess franchise. It was released in 1998, directed again by Richard Rich, and features the voices of Michelle Nicastro and Brian Nissen as Odette and Derek. This film follows Derek and Odette having to deal with Zelda, a sorceress who is seeking the Forbidden Arts and wishes to use them to destroy Odette and Derek's happiness.

The Swan Princess: Christmas (2012)

The Swan Princess: Christmas is a 2012 American computer-animated fantasy film produced by Crest Animation Productions and Nest Family Entertainment, directed by Richard Rich, and starring the voices of Laura Bailey as Odette and Yuri Lowenthal as Derek. It is the fourth film in The Swan Princess series. The first released in 14 years, it follows the adventures of Odette and Derek celebrating their first Christmas together. While the three previous films in the series were animated using traditional 2D hand-drawn animation, The Swan Princess Christmas was the first film to be created entirely with 3D CGI animation.

The Swan Princess: A Royal Family Tale (2014)

The Swan Princess: A Royal Family Tale is a 2014 American computer-animated fantasy film produced by Crest Animation Productions and Nest Family Entertainment, directed by Richard Rich, and starring the voices of Laura Bailey as Odette and Yuri Lowenthal as Derek. It is the fifth film in The Swan Princess series and follows Odette and Derek's adoption of a young girl named Alise, and their battle to defeat the Forbidden Arts. The film marks the 20th anniversary of The Swan Princess. It was released directly to DVD and Blu-ray on February 25, 2014.

The Swan Princess: Princess Tomorrow, Pirate Today! (2016)
The Swan Princess: Princess Tomorrow, Pirate Today is an American 2016 direct-to-DVD computer-animated sequel and sees Alise on an adventure overseas. Produced by Crest Animation Productions, Nest Family Entertainment and Streetlight Productions, it was directed by Richard Rich and stars the voices of Jayden Isabel as Alise and Grant Durazzo as Lucas. It is the sixth film in The Swan Princess series and follows the adventures of Odette and Derek's daughter Alise on her first journey as a member of the royal family overseas. It was released direct-to-DVD on September 6, 2016.

The Swan Princess: Royally Undercover (2017)
The Swan Princess: Royally Undercover is a 2017 computer-animated direct-to-DVD computer-animated sequel and sees Alise and Lucas on a secret spy adventure. It is a musical comedy film produced by Crest Animation Productions and Nest Family Entertainment, directed by Richard Rich and starring the voices of Laura Bailey as Odette, Yuri Lowenthal as Derek, Jayden Isabel as Alise and Grant Durazzo as Lucas. This seventh film in The Swan Princess series was released on DVD and Digital HD on March 28, 2017.

The Swan Princess: A Royal Myztery (2018)
The Swan Princess: A Royal Myztery is a 2018 direct-to-DVD computer-animated sequel where Odette and her friends investigate the mysterious appearance of the "Z" and learn what it signifies. It was released on March 27, 2018.

The Swan Princess: the Kingdom of Music (2019)
The Swan Princess: Kingdom of Music is a 2019 direct-to-DVD computer-animated sequel where Odette is hosting a music competition to celebrate Princess Alise's birthday. This film commemorates the 25th anniversary of The Swan Princess.

The Swan Princess: A Royal Wedding (2020)
The Swan Princess: A Royal Wedding is a 2020 direct-to-DVD computer-animated sequel where Princess Odette and Prince Derek are going to the wedding of Princess Mei Li and her beloved Chen. But evil forces are at stake, the wedding plans are tarnished, and true love has difficult conditions.

Cast and characters

Notes

Additional crew and production details

Reception
TBA

References

External links
 
 

Children's film series
 
Films_based_on_fairy_tales
Film series introduced in 1994
Sony Pictures franchises